Karola Ebeling is a German television and film actress.

Selected filmography
 The Beautiful Miller (1954)
 Love is Forever (1954)
 Intrigue and Love (1959)

References

Bibliography
 Goble, Alan. The Complete Index to Literary Sources in Film. Walter de Gruyter, 1999.

External links

1935 births
Living people
German film actresses
German television actresses
Actresses from Berlin